Mendigorría (Basque: Mendigorria) is a town and municipality located in the province and autonomous community of Navarre, northern Spain.  The Battle of Mendigorría took place here in 1835.

References

External links
 MENDIGORRIA in the Bernardo Estornés Lasa - Auñamendi Encyclopedia (Euskomedia Fundazioa) 

Municipalities in Navarre